Reginaldo Polloni (14 November 1926 – 22 August 2004) was an Italian rower. He competed at the 1948 Summer Olympics in London with the men's coxed four where they were eliminated in the semi-final.

References

External links
 

1926 births
2004 deaths
Italian male rowers
Olympic rowers of Italy
Rowers at the 1948 Summer Olympics
People from Lovere
European Rowing Championships medalists
Sportspeople from the Province of Bergamo